Palletoori Pilla is a 1950 Indian Telugu-language film, produced and directed by B. A. Subba Rao under the Sobhanachela & B. A. Subba Rao Joint Productions banner. It stars N. T. Rama Rao, Akkineni Nageswara Rao and Anjali Devi, with music was composed by P. Adinarayana Rao. The film marks the first collaboration between Nageswara Rao and Rama Rao who further acted in 14 films together thereafter.

The film is loosely based on the English play Pizaro by Richard Brinsley Sheridan. It was dubbed into Tamil as Grama Penn which became a hit. It was later remade in Hindi as Insaniyat (1955).

Plot
Santha (Anjali Devi), a beautiful village girl, grows up along with her cousin Vasanth (Akkineni Nageswara Rao). Vasanth loves her from childhood without her knowledge. In the nearby territory, there lives a dangerous dacoit Kampanna Dora (A. V. Subba Rao) who frequently raids and loots the villages.

Once in their attack, Santha slaps Kampanna's main associate Jayanth (N. T. Rama Rao) and argues convincingly regarding their lifestyle and livelihood. The incident makes Jayanth reform, and decide to leave the realm when a rift arises between Jayanth and Kampanna and he is imprisoned. But Jayanth absconds with the help of Thatha (S. V. Ranga Rao) a casuist in their squad and reaches Santha's village.

At that juncture, he shields Vasanth and Santha against an onslaught of bulls when the villagers embrace and shelter him. Thereafter, Jayanth aegis & develops self-defense skills in them when Santha starts loving him. Knowing it, enraged Vasanth tries to knock out Jayanth, but after learning the real intention of Santha, he couples up them. Right now, Kampanna traipses to destroy the village by slaughtering Thatha when he is crushed by the villagers.

Time passes, and Santha gives birth to a baby boy, presently, they celebrate a folk festival when Kampanna ploys and captures Jayanth. Then, Santha denounces Vasanth when affronted Vasanth affirms to safeguard Jayanth and proceeds towards Kampanna's fort. Meanwhile, anxious Santha also moves in search of her husband when the baby is too caught by Kampanna's men. At last, Vasanth protects Jayanth and baby by sacrificing his life and also gives pardon to Kampanna which makes him repent. Finally, the movie ends, and it is shown that Vasanth's soul blesses the villagers.

Cast
Cast according to the song book

Male Cast
 Nageswara Rao as Vasanth
 N. T. Rama Rao as Jayanth
 A. V. Subba Rao as Kampana Dora
 S. V. Ranga Rao as Dhathra
 Koteswara Rao as Marthand
 Ramamurthi as Lapam
 Sethuramaiah as Dapam
 Kadapalli Ramayya as Purandarayya

Female Cast
 Anjali Devi as Santha
 Lakshmikanta as Rajini
 Bala Saraswathi as Sambha
 Baby Mallika as Sasi
 Hemalatha as Vasanth's Mother
 Kanakam
 Seetha

Soundtrack
Music composed by P. Adinarayana Rao. Music released on Audio Company.

Production 
This was the first movie of the NTR and ANR combination. Initially, Raghuramayya was selected for the hero's role and later he was replaced by ANR. This is the first film of N. T. Rama Rao in a lead role. His second film was Shavukaru, which was shot after Palletoori Pilla released earlier. For an action sequence, N. T. Rama Rao refused to let the director employ a stunt double and fought with a violent bull himself. The director had told Rama Rao only to catch the horns of the Australian bull he had to fight (to save Santha and Vasanth), but Rama Rao literally fought with the savage bull which ultimately threw him to the ground, fracturing his right hand. Despite being told to take rest, Rama Rao reported for the shoot the very next day. Two fractures later, Rama Rao was still shooting, wearing full sleeves to cover the bandages.

Box office
The film ran for more than 100 days in 7 centers in Andhra Pradesh.

References

Bibliography
 Naati 101 Chitralu (Telugu hit films released between 1931 and 1965), S. V. Rama Rao, Kinnera Publications, Hyderabad, 2006, pages: 52–3.

External links 
 

1950 films
1950s Telugu-language films
Films directed by B. A. Subba Rao
Indian black-and-white films
Indian films based on plays
Telugu films remade in other languages